
Victor Adler (24 June 1852 – 11 November 1918) was an Austrian politician, a leader of the labour movement and founder of the Social Democratic Workers' Party (SDAP).

Life
Adler was born in Prague, the son of a Jewish merchant, who came from Leipnik in Moravia. His family moved to the Leopoldstadt borough of Vienna when he was three years old. He attended the renowned Catholic Schottenstift gymnasium, together with Heinrich Friedjung one of the few Jewish students, whereafter he studied chemistry and medicine at the University of Vienna. Having graduated in 1881, he worked as assistant of Theodor Meynert at the psychiatric department of the General Hospital.

In 1878, he had married Emma Braun. Their son Friedrich was born in 1879. From 1882 to 1889, the couple resided at 19 Berggasse in the Alsergrund borough of Vienna, an address that later became famous as the office of Sigmund Freud (the present-day Sigmund Freud Museum).

Adler initially supported the German national movement led by Georg Schönerer and worked on the 1882 Linz Program. However, Schönerer's increasingly antisemitic policies, culminating in the amendment of an Aryan paragraph, led to an estrangement with Adler, who focussed on social issues. From 1886 he published the Marxist journal Gleichheit (Equality), covering the working conditions of the Wienerberger brick factory and agitating against the truck system. After Gleichheit was banned, he issued the Arbeiter-Zeitung (Workers' Newspaper) from 1889.  Adler travelled to Germany and Switzerland, where he met with Friedrich Engels, August Bebel and Karl Liebknecht. He was charged several times for his activities and spent nine months in prison.

Adler, a both moderate and charismatic social democrat, was able to unite the Austrian labour movement under his leadership, fighting against the anti-socialist laws implemented by the Cisleithanian government of Minister President Eduard Taaffe in 1884. At an 1888 conference in Hainfeld he formed the Social Democratic Workers' Party and became its first chairman. As a member of the Imperial Council parliament from 1905, he played a leading role in the fight for universal suffrage, finally achieved under Minister President Max Wladimir von Beck in 1906, whereafter the Social Democrats emerged as winner from the 1907 Cisleithanian legislative election. An active supporter of the Second International, Adler tried to maintain the unity of the Austrian Social Democrats beyond ethnic conflicts and backed the idea of the United States of Greater Austria replacing the Dual Monarchy.

Before World War I, Adler was leader of what is now called the Social Democratic Party of Austria in Vienna. He publicly backed the Imperial government's decision to go to war, but had private misgivings.  Entering the new Austrian government in October 1918, he advocated the Anschluss (unification) of the rump Austrian state with Germany but died of heart failurecoincidentally on the last day of World War Ibefore he could pursue this project. He was the father of Friedrich Adler.

He died in Vienna.

See also 
 Linz Program of 1882

Notes

References 
 Victor Adler at Encyclopædia Britannica
 Victor Adler at Marxists.org
 Tucker, Spencer C; Roberts, Priscilla Mary (2005), Encyclopedia of World War I, Santa Barbara: ABC-Clio, v.1, p. 8. , 
 Jakub Bene: Adler, Victor, In: 1914-1918-online. International Encyclopedia of the First World War

External links
 

1852 births
1918 deaths
Politicians from Prague
People from the Kingdom of Bohemia
Austro-Hungarian Jews
Jewish Austrian politicians
Social Democratic Party of Austria politicians
Foreign ministers of Austria
Members of the Austrian House of Deputies (1901–1907)
Members of the Austrian House of Deputies (1907–1911)
Members of the Austrian House of Deputies (1911–1918)
Members of the Provisional National Assembly
Jewish socialists
Austrian newspaper editors
Burials at the Vienna Central Cemetery